Manuel Ávila (born July 4, 1992) is an American professional boxer. He is the IBA Americas Featherweight Champion & NABF Superbantamweight Champion.

Personal life
He has three children, Married to a woman named Cynthia Avila his parents Manuel and Joanne and he has two sisters . And he’s been seen with 3 kids who we assume are his nieces and nephew, Names unknown Age unknown.

Professional career
He is signed by Golden Boy Promotions. On November 18, 2010, Ávila beat the veteran Alexis Hernández at the Club Nokia in Los Angeles, California.

References

External links

American boxers of Mexican descent
Boxers from California
Featherweight boxers
1992 births
Living people
American male boxers
Sportspeople from Vallejo, California